Rahmat may refer to:

People
Rahmat Akbari (b. 2000), Australian association football player
Rahmat Rivai (b. 1977), Indonesian footballer
Rahmat Shah Sail (b. 1943), Pashto writer
Basuki Rahmat (1921-1969), Indonesian general
Mohamed Rahmat (1938-2010), Malaysian politician
M. Rahmat, Indonesian footballer
Rahmatullah Rahmat, Afghan politician
N.M.Rahmat, Malaysian Power Cable Exporter - Universal and Leader Cable Industry
Rahmat Mohamad, Former Secretary General of Asian-African Legal Consultative Organization; Professor of Law at Universiti Teknologi MARA Malaysia
Iskandar Rahmat (b. 1979),  convicted murderer in Singapore
Fazely bin Rahmat, a convicted gang member of Salakau in Singapore.

Places
Rahmatabad, Selseleh, a village in Lorestan Province, Iran
Rahmat Rural District, in Fars Province, Iran

Other uses
KD Rahmat, Malaysian Navy ship